Dermot Earley may refer to:
Dermot Earley Snr (1948–2010), Roscommon Gaelic footballer and chief of staff of the Irish Defence Forces
Dermot Earley Jnr (born 1978), his son, Kildare Gaelic footballer